Carlton Freeman is a United States Virgin Islands professional soccer coach.

Career
Since 2004 until 2008 he coached the United States Virgin Islands national football team.

References

External links
Profile at Soccerway.com
Profile at Soccerpunter.com

Year of birth missing (living people)
Living people
American soccer coaches
United States Virgin Islands soccer coaches
United States Virgin Islands national soccer team managers
Place of birth missing (living people)